Re-Dunn is the fourth solo studio album by country music artist Ronnie Dunn. The album was released January 10, 2020, via LWR. The album is a 24-song project that features covers that have left an impact on Dunn, with him calling it a "passion project".

Following the album's announcement in September 2019, two songs, one country and one rock, were issued each month until the release date.

Background 
Recording for the album began in 2018 at Dunn's home studio. The idea initially was planned as a rock covers project. Dunn had already recorded two dozen rock songs in 2018 while he was working on the Brooks & Dunn album Reboot; however, once that project was finished, he decided to throw in some country songs. Many of the musicians that worked on the album Dunn has worked with in the past and knew of their capabilities, making the recording process more of a fun jam session.

Commercial performance
The album has sold 10,100 copies in the United States as of March 2020.

Track listing

Personnel
Adapted from liner notes.

Bob Bailey - background vocals (track 10)
Perry Coleman - background vocals (tracks 1, 3, 5, 6, 8, 12, 13, 15, 18, 20, 24)
Chad Cromwell - drums (tracks 5, 8, 13, 14, 18)
Chip Davis - background vocals (track 23)
Dan Dugmore - steel guitar (tracks 9, 17, 22)
Ronnie Dunn - lead vocals (all tracks)
Kim Fleming - background vocals (track 10)
Paul Franklin - steel guitar (tracks 1, 6, 12, 16, 20, 24)
Kenny Greenberg - acoustic guitar (track 11), baritone guitar (track 22), electric guitar (tracks 2, 4, 9, 11, 17, 22)
Trey Grey - drums (track 19)
Vicki Hampton - background vocals (track 10)
Tania Hancheroff - background vocals (tracks 1, 3, 5, 6, 8, 12-16, 18, 20, 24)
Rob Harrington - bass guitar (track 19)
Mark Hill - bass guitar (tracks 1, 3, 5-8, 12-16, 18, 20, 23, 24)
Charlie Judge - bass guitar (track 10), B-3 organ (tracks 3, 4, 6, 7, 9, 11, 15, 16, 20, 22, 23), drums (track 10), keyboards (tracks 1-3, 5-8, 10-16, 18, 20, 23, 24), percussion (track 10), piano (track 9), programming (track 10), strings (track 13), synthesizer (tracks 2, 11, 17), Wurlitzer (tracks 4, 22)
Jeff King - electric guitar (tracks 1, 3, 5-8, 10, 12-16, 18, 20, 23, 24)
Mike "Juice" Kyle - B-3 organ (track 21), keyboards (track 21)
Neil Kyle - drums (track 21)
Brent Mason - electric guitar (tracks 1, 3, 5-8, 12-16, 18, 20, 23, 24)
Jerry McPherson - acoustic guitar (tracks 9, 11, 17, 22), electric guitar (tracks 2, 4, 11)
Pat McGrath - acoustic guitar (tracks 1, 3, 6, 7, 12, 15, 16, 20, 23, 24), mandolin (track 23)
Greg Morrow - bongo (track 22), claves (track 22), drums (tracks 1-4, 6, 7, 9, 11, 12, 15-17, 20, 22-24), percussion (tracks 1-4, 6, 7, 11, 12, 15-17, 20, 23, 24), shaker (track 22), tambourine (tracks 9, 17, 22)
Gary Morse - steel guitar (tracks 3-5, 7, 8, 10, 11, 13-15, 17, 18, 23)
Chris Rodriguez - acoustic guitar (tracks 5, 8, 13, 14, 18), electric guitar (track 21)
Dwayne Rowe - B-3 organ (track 19), keyboards (track 19)
Dow Tomlin - bass guitar (track 21)
Lou Toomey - electric guitar (track 19)
Glenn Worf - bass guitar (tracks 2, 4, 9, 11, 17, 22)

Charts

See also
List of 2020 albums

References

2020 albums
Ronnie Dunn albums
Covers albums